Bisaltes picticornis is a species of beetle in the family Cerambycidae. It was described by Galileo and Martins in 2003.

References

picticornis
Beetles described in 2003